Paul Pena is the 1971 debut album by blind singer-songwriter Paul Pena. After 40 years out of print, the album has been officially re-released in mp3 format and is available at amazon.com and the iTunes Store.

Track listing
All songs written by Paul Pena except where noted.
"Woke Up This Morning" – 4:50
"I'm Gonna Make It Alright" – 4:07
"The River" – 6:03
"One for the Lonely" – 4:48
"Something to Make You Happy" – 7:05
"My Adorable One" (Ida Irral Berger/Clara Thompson) – 3:30
"When I'm Gone" – 4:33
"Lullaby" – 5:10

Personnel
 Paul Pena – guitar, keyboards (on "The River"), lead vocals, background vocals
 Jesse Raye – bass, background vocals
 Jim Wilkins – drums
 Ed Costa – keyboards, background vocals
 Jeff Baxter – steel guitar
 Jumma Santos – congas, maracas
 Betsy Morse – harp
 Clarice Taylor – background vocals
 Ellis Hall – background vocals
 Gil Thomas – background vocals
 Earl Frost – background vocals
 Ronnie Ingraham Concert Choir – background vocals (on "The River")

Production
 Producer: Gunther Weil
 Engineers: Adam Taylor
 Mixing: Adam Taylor
 Photography: Steve Hansen
 Cover Art: Julia Pearl
 Liner Notes: Gerd Stern
 A&R Coordinator: Michael Sunday
 Recorded at Intermedia in Boston

References

1971 debut albums
Paul Pena albums
Capitol Records albums